José Pratas Romão (born 13 April 1954) is a Portuguese former football winger and manager.

Playing career
Born in Beja, Alentejo, Romão started playing for local C.D. Beja. He also represented Vitória de Guimarães, AD Fafe, F.C. Penafiel, G.D. Riopele, G.C. Alcobaça and F.C. Vizela in a 15-year professional career.

Romão spent five seasons in the Primeira Liga with Guimarães, never managing to be more than a reserve player. His last campaign at that level was 1982–83, being relegated with Alcobaça. He retired in June 1984, at only 30 years of age.

Coaching career
Romão started working as a manager immediately after retiring, being in charge as Vizela had their first experience in the top flight in 1984–85 – the team finished in the 16th and last position in the league, being immediately relegated. From the start of the 1987–88 season until the end of the 1999–2000 campaign he always worked in the Portuguese top tier, starting with Penafiel and being mainly in charge of G.D. Chaves, which he led to the fifth place in 1989–90 in a total of three stints.

In the summer of 2000, Romão joined António Oliveira's staff at the Portugal national team, holding his position until the end of the 2002 FIFA World Cup. Subsequently, he was in charge of the under-21 side, and was also the nation's manager in the ill-fated campaign at the 2004 Summer Olympics in Athens.

Romão started managing abroad in 2005 with Wydad AC, then had spells with Al-Arabi SC (Qatar), Raja CA (two), Kuwait SC and Al-Arabi SC (Kuwait). During his stint in the Moroccan Botola, he led both WAC and Raja to the national championship.

References

External links

1954 births
Living people
People from Beja, Portugal
Portuguese footballers
Association football wingers
Primeira Liga players
Liga Portugal 2 players
C.D. Beja players
Vitória S.C. players
AD Fafe players
F.C. Penafiel players
G.D. Riopele players
G.C. Alcobaça players
F.C. Vizela players
Portuguese football managers
Primeira Liga managers
Liga Portugal 2 managers
F.C. Vizela managers
F.C. Penafiel managers
G.D. Chaves managers
Vitória F.C. managers
F.C. Famalicão managers
C.F. Os Belenenses managers
Associação Académica de Coimbra – O.A.F. managers
Wydad AC managers
Raja CA managers
AS FAR (football) managers
Qatar Stars League managers
Al-Arabi SC (Qatar) managers
Kuwait Premier League managers
Kuwait SC managers
Al-Arabi SC (Kuwait) managers
Portuguese expatriate football managers
Expatriate football managers in Morocco
Expatriate football managers in Qatar
Expatriate football managers in Kuwait
Portuguese expatriate sportspeople in Morocco
Portuguese expatriate sportspeople in Qatar
Portuguese expatriate sportspeople in Kuwait
Sportspeople from Beja District
Botola managers